The 2013 ACC Championship Game was the eighth football championship game for the Atlantic Coast Conference.  It featured the Florida State Seminoles, winners of the ACC's Atlantic Division, and the Duke Blue Devils, winners of the ACC's Coastal Division. Duke was the first team other than Georgia Tech or Virginia Tech to represent the Coastal in the ACC Championship Game.

This was the game's fourth consecutive year at Bank of America Stadium in Charlotte, North Carolina.

A 45-7 Florida State win cemented a position for the Seminoles in the national championship game while Duke settled for the Chick-fil-A Bowl. Jameis Winston, quarterback of the Florida State Seminoles, accounted for four total touchdowns (3 passing, 1 rushing) and Devonta Freeman paced the rushing attack with 91 yards on 18 carries and a touchdown in the dominating victory.

Florida State defeated Auburn in the national championship game on January 6, 2014.

Teams

Atlantic Division champions

Coastal Division champions

Scoring summary

1st quarter scoring:
There were no points scored in the 1st quarter.

2nd quarter scoring:
 FSU - TD	12:36	Kelvin Benjamin 14 Yd Pass From Jameis Winston (Roberto Aguayo Kick)
 FSU - TD	03:37	Karlos Williams 12 Yd Run (Roberto Aguayo Kick)	
 FSU - FG	00:25	Roberto Aguayo 45 Yd

3rd quarter scoring:
 FSU - TD	09:52	Kenny Shaw 11 Yd Pass From Jameis Winston (Roberto Aguayo Kick)
 FSU - TD	06:31	Kelvin Benjamin 54 Yd Pass From Jameis Winston (Roberto Aguayo Kick)
 FSU - TD	02:38	Jameis Winston 17 Yd Run (Roberto Aguayo Kick)

4th quarter scoring:
 FSU - TD	07:25	Devonta Freeman 7 Yd Run (Roberto Aguayo Kick)
 Duke - TD	01:01	Josh Snead 5 Yd Run (Ross Martin Kick)

Statistics

References

Championship
ACC Championship Game
Duke Blue Devils football games
Florida State Seminoles football games
ACC Championship Game
ACC Championship Game